Cihat Teğin (born 16 November 1915, date of death unknown) was a Turkish fencer. He competed in the individual and team sabre events at the 1936 Summer Olympics.

References

External links
 

1915 births
Year of death missing
Turkish male sabre fencers
Olympic fencers of Turkey
Fencers at the 1936 Summer Olympics